Selagia subochrella is a species of snout moth. It is found in Spain, Bosnia and Herzegovina, Bulgaria, North Macedonia, Greece and Russia.

References

Moths described in 1849
Phycitini
Moths of Europe
Moths of Asia